Internet Map Server (IMS) provide maps through the Internet usually as images. One standard specification for such a server is the OGC Web Map Service.

References

GIS software